Mullvad is an open-source commercial VPN service based in Sweden. Launched in March 2009, Mullvad operates using the WireGuard and OpenVPN protocols. Mullvad accepts Bitcoin, Bitcoin Cash, and Monero for payment in addition to conventional payment methods.

History
Mullvad was launched in March 2009 by Amagicom AB. Its name is Swedish for mole.

Mullvad began supporting connections via the OpenVPN protocol in 2009. Mullvad was an early adopter and supporter of the WireGuard protocol, announcing the availability of the new VPN protocol in March 2017 and making a "generous donation" supporting WireGuard development between July and December 2017.

In September 2018, the cybersecurity firm Cure53 performed a Penetration test on Mullvad's OSX, Windows and Linux applications. Seven issues were found which were addressed by Mullvad. Cure53 tested only the applications and supporting functions. No assessment was made on the Mullvad server side and back end. 

In October 2019, Mullvad partnered with Mozilla. Mozilla's VPN service, Mozilla VPN, utilizes Mullvad's WireGuard servers.

In April 2020, Mullvad partnered with Malwarebytes and provided WireGuard servers for their VPN service, Malwarebytes Privacy.

In May 2022, Mullvad started officially accepting Monero.

Service
A TechRadar review noted 2019 that "Mullvad's core service is powerful, up-to-date, and absolutely stuffed with high-end technologies." Complementing its use of the open-source OpenVPN and WireGuard protocols, Mullvad includes "industrial strength" encryption (employing AES-256 GCM methodology), 4096-bit RSA certificates with SHA-512 for server authentication, perfect forward secrecy, "multiple layers" of DNS leak protection, IPv6 leak protection, "multiple stealth options" to help bypass government or corporate VPN blocking, and built-in support for port forwarding.

Mullvad provides VPN client applications for computers running under Windows, macOS and Linux operating systems. , native iOS and Android Mullvad VPN clients using the WireGuard protocol are available. iOS and Android mobile operating system users can also configure and use built-in VPN clients or the OpenVPN or WireGuard apps to access Mullvad's service.

Privacy
No email address or other identifying information is requested during Mullvad's registration process. Rather, a unique 16-digit account number is anonymously generated for each new user. This account number is henceforth used to log in to the Mullvad service.

To help ensure the privacy of its users, Mullvad accepts the anonymous payment methods of cash, Bitcoin, Bitcoin Cash and Monero. (Payment for the service can also be made via bank wire transfer, credit card, PayPal, and Swish). In June 2022, the service announced that it will no longer offer new recurring subscriptions, as this would further reduce the amount of personal information that will have to be stored.

Mullvad's no-logging policy precludes logging of VPN users' IP addresses, the VPN IP address used, browsing activity, bandwidth, connections, session duration, timestamps, and DNS requests.

Mullvad has been actively campaigning against the EU's Regulation to Prevent and Combat Child Sexual Abuse which they refer as the "chat control proposal".

Reception
While Mullvad has been noted for taking a strong approach to privacy and maintaining good connection speeds, the VPN client setup and interface has been noted as being more onerous and technically involved than some other VPN providers especially on some client platforms. However, a follow-up review by the same source in October 2018 notes, "Mullvad has a much improved, modern Windows client (and one for Mac, too)." A PC World review, also from October 2018, concludes, "With its commitment to privacy, anonymity (as close as you can realistically get online), and performance Mullvad remains our top recommendation for a VPN service."

In November 2018, TechRadar noted Mullvad as one of five VPN providers to answer to a set of trustworthiness questions posed by the Center for Democracy and Technology. In March 2019, a TechRadar review noted slightly substandard speeds. However, a more recent and more thorough TechRadar review dated June 11, 2019 stated that "speeds are excellent." While the latter review notes a shortcoming for mobile users in that Mullvad provided no mobile VPN client apps, there is now a mobile app for both Android and iOS available.

The non-profit Freedom of the Press Foundation, in their "Choosing a VPN" guide, lists Mullvad amongst the four VPNs that meet their recommended settings and features for VPN use as a tool for protecting online activity.

See also

Comparison of virtual private network services

References

External links

Source code on GitHub

Internet privacy
Virtual private network services
Free and open-source software